The 2008–09 LEB Plata season was the 9th  season of the LEB Plata, second league of the Liga Española de Baloncesto and third division in Spain. It is also named Adecco Plata for sponsorship reasons.

Competition format
16 teams play the regular season. This is a round robin, where each team will play twice against every rival. The champion of the Regular Season is promoted to LEB Oro and the eight next teams enter the play-offs, where the winner is promoted too.

The last two qualified teams were relegated to LEB Bronce.

If two or more teams have got the same number of winning games, the criteria of tie-breaking are these:
Head-to-head winning games.
Head-to-head points difference.
Total points difference.

Regular season

League table

(C) indicates Copa LEB Plata champion.

Copa LEB Plata
At the half of the first round, the two first teams in the table play the Copa LEB Plata at home of the winner of the first half season. The Champion of this Cup will play the play-offs as first qualified if finishes the league between the 2nd and the 5th qualified.

Faymasa Palencia was the champion after defeating Torrons Vicens L'Hospitalet by 69–65.

Playoffs
Teams qualified from 2nd to 9th will play the promotion play-off. If the winner of Copa LEB Plata is qualified between 2nd and 5th at the final of the Regular Season, it will join the play-offs as 2nd qualified. A best-of-five series and a Final Four hosted at Fuenlabrada (with re-seeding) decided who promotes to LEB Oro.

MVP of the regular season
 Robert Joseph (Leyma Básquet Coruña)

Final Four MVP
 Nihad Đedović (WTC Almeda Park Cornellà)

External links
LEB Plata website in FEB.es

LEB Plata seasons
LEB3